The Virginia Tech Hokies football statistical leaders are individual statistical leaders of the Virginia Tech Hokies football program in various categories, including passing, rushing, receiving, total offense, defensive stats, and kicking. Within those areas, the lists identify single-game, single-season, and career leaders. The Hokies represent Virginia Polytechnic Institute and State University in the NCAA's Atlantic Coast Conference.

Although Virginia Tech began competing in intercollegiate football in 1892, the school's official record book generally does not include entries from before the 1950s, as the records from this era are often incomplete and inconsistent.

These lists are dominated by more recent players for several reasons:
 Since the 1950s, seasons have increased from 10 games to 11 and then 12 games in length.
 The NCAA didn't allow freshmen to play varsity football until 1972 (with the exception of the World War II years), allowing players to have four-year careers.
 Bowl games only began counting toward single-season and career statistics in 2002. The Hokies have played in 15 bowl games since then, giving players since 2002 an extra game to accumulate statistics. Similarly, the Hokies have played in the ACC Championship Game five times since it began.
 All ten of the Hokies' 10 highest seasons in offensive output, both in yardage and scoring, have come during current head coach Frank Beamer's tenure, and eight of them have come in the 21st century.

These lists are updated through the end of the 2018 season. The Virginia Tech football record book generally does not give a full top 10 in single-game statistics.

Passing

Passing yards

Passing touchdowns

Rushing

Rushing yards

Rushing touchdowns

Receiving

Receptions

Receiving yards

Receiving touchdowns

Total offense
Total offense is the sum of passing and rushing statistics. It does not include receiving or returns.

Total offense yards

Total touchdowns

Defense

Interceptions

Tackles
Note: The Virginia Tech Record Book does not include a full top 10 in tackles stats, instead listing only a leader.

Sacks
Note: The Virginia Tech Record Book does not include a full top 10 in sacks stats, instead listing only a leader.

Kicking

Field goals made

Field goal percentage

References

Virginia Tech